Jean Gaultier may refer to:
 Jean Paul Gaultier, French fashion designer
 Jean François Gaultier, French physician and botanist